Dariusz Zelig (born 22 November 1957) is a Polish former basketball player. He competed in the men's tournament at the 1980 Summer Olympics.

References

External links
 

1957 births
Living people
Polish men's basketball players
Olympic basketball players of Poland
Basketball players at the 1980 Summer Olympics
People from Koszalin
Sportspeople from West Pomeranian Voivodeship